Adam John Haayer (born February 22, 1977) is a former American football offensive tackle in the National Football League. He was drafted by the Tennessee Titans in the sixth round of the 2001 NFL Draft. He played college football at Minnesota.

Haayer also played for the Minnesota Vikings, Arizona Cardinals, and St. Louis Rams.

References

1977 births
Living people
American football offensive tackles
Minnesota Golden Gophers football players
Tennessee Titans players
Minnesota Vikings players
Arizona Cardinals players
St. Louis Rams players
Forest Lake Area High School alumni